Take a Look Around may refer to:

"Take a Look Around" (song), a song by Limp Bizkit
Take a Look Around (album), an album by Masta Ace, or the title song
"Take a Look Around", a song by The Temptations from Solid Rock
"Take a Look Around", a song by James Gang from Yer' Album
"Take a Look Around", song by the 2 Bears from Be Strong